Danilo Ramon Subiaga Fernandez (born January 14, 1966), more commonly known as Dan Fernandez, is a Filipino politician, actor, and optometrist who is currently serving as a representative of the Lone District of Santa Rosa, Laguna at the House of Representatives of the Philippines since 2022. He previously represented the 1st District of Laguna from 2007 to 2016 and again from 2019 to 2022; he also concurrently served as a Deputy Speaker from 2019 to 2020. Prior to his election in the Congress, he served as a board member of Laguna, Vice Governor of Laguna under Governor Teresita Lazaro, and Mayor of Santa Rosa. He also ran for governor in 2004 but lost to Lazaro.

Early life and education
Danilo Ramon Fernandez was born January 14, 1966. He was the youngest of the four children of Edilberto Fernandez Sr., who served as a councilor of Pagsanjan, and Teresita Fernandez. His paternal grandfather is Estanislao Fernandez, who served as a lawmaker from Laguna, senator, and Supreme Court associate justice.

He completed his elementary education at Pagsanjan Academy as a valedictorian. He completed his secondary education at Francisco Benitez Memorial School in Pagsanjan, where he earned an honorable mention. He was granted a college scholarship at the Centro Escolar University in Manila, where he completed doctor of optometry. He passed the optometry licensure examination in 1986. He then took up law at University of Santo Tomas but later dropped out to pursue an acting career.

Career

Acting career 
Dan Fernandez entered show business when he accepted an offer to become an actor in 1986, while he was working out at YMCA of Manila during his law school days. He was known for acting in Mara Clara: The Movie (1996), Balawis (1997), Kobra (1997), Boy Tapang (1999), Upak Gang (2015), and Honor Thy Father (2015).

Political career

House of Representatives (2007-2016)
After losing the 2004 gubernatorial elections, Fernandez decided to return to politics by running for representative of the first district of Laguna in 2007. He won the elections defeating Atty. Nereo Joaquin Jr., the son of former Representatives Nereo and Uliran Joaquin. On November 20, 2009, his election was annulled by the House of Representatives Electoral Tribunal for failing to complete the two-year residency requirement prior to filing his 2007 candidacy but it was reversed by the Supreme Court on January 4, 2010.

Fernandez ran for re-election in 2010 and won defeating his predecessor, Uliran Joaquin. He was once again re-elected in 2013.

As a member of the House of Representatives, Fernandez sponsored and authored 19 House measures. He also co-authored 13 House Bills and Resolutions.

Fernandez served on numerous committees as a member of the Philippine House of Representatives:
Ecology
Dangerous Drugs
Justice
Labor and Employment
Public Information
Public Order and Safety
Southern Tagalog Development
Trade and Industry
Transportation

Mayor of Santa Rosa (2016-2019)
Fernandez ran for Mayor of Santa Rosa City in 2016. He won the elections, defeating two opponents. However, in 2019, he decided not to seek re-election to seek a comeback to the Congress instead.

House of Representatives (2019-present)
He was elected to his fourth term as Representative of the 1st District of Laguna without having any opponents in 2019. He was then named as one of the Deputy Speakers under the new Speakership of Alan Peter Cayetano. He is one of the 70 congressmen who voted against the renewal of the ABS-CBN franchise. His vote of denial to his former home network's hopes of renewing its legislative franchise sparked controversy from both the entertainment industry and the social media, branding him as a "traitor".

He was removed as the Deputy Speaker on November 18, 2020. In January 2021, Fernandez is announced to be part of the new bloc "BTS sa Kongreso" (named after the K-pop boy band group BTS of South Korea), a coalition group formed by Alan Peter Cayetano during the 18th Congress.

Fernandez sought re-election in 2022, this time for the newly established lone district of Santa Rosa. He was elected, making him the first representative of the new district. In the 19th Congress, he was named as the chairman of the House Committee on Public Order and Safety.

Personal life 
Fernandez is married to actress Sheila Ysrael. His son Danzel Rafter is an incumbent board member of Laguna from the 1st district since 2022.

References

External links
Danilo Ramon S. Fernandez Congress profile (19th Congress)
Danilo Ramon S. Fernandez Congress profile (15th Congress)
Danilo Ramon S. Fernandez Congress profile (14th Congress)

1966 births
Filipino optometrists
Living people
Male actors from Laguna (province)
Mayors of places in Laguna (province)
Members of the House of Representatives of the Philippines from Laguna (province)
Members of the Laguna Provincial Board
People from Santa Rosa, Laguna
Deputy Speakers of the House of Representatives of the Philippines
Centro Escolar University alumni
National Unity Party (Philippines) politicians